The 2021 BYU Cougars baseball team represented Brigham Young University during the 2021 NCAA Division I baseball season.  Mike Littlewood acted as head coach of the Cougars for a ninth consecutive season. The Cougars were picked to finish fourth in the WCC Pre-season poll. The Cougars entered the season after having watched the WCC cancel the 2020 season due to the COVID-19 pandemic. As a cost containment measure, the WCC cut the 2021 baseball tournament, so the regular season champion will got the conferences auto-bid to the NCAA Tournament. The Cougars went 23–27 overall, 15–12 in conference, and finished fourth in the standings.

2021 Roster

Schedule 

! style=""| Regular Season
|- 

|- align="center" bgcolor="ffbbb"
| February 20 || at Texas State || – || Bobcat Ballpark  || ESPN+ || 4–5 || Austin Smith (1–0) || Easton Walker (0–1) || Tristan Stivors (1) || 165 || 0–1 || –
|- bgcolor="#ccffcc"
| February 20 || at Texas State || – || Bobcat Ballpark || ESPN+ || 9–4 || Bryce Robison (1–0) || Trevis Sundgren (0–1) || Reid McLaughlin (1) || 151 || 1–1 || –
|- align="center" bgcolor="ffbbb"
| February 22 || at Texas State || – || Bobcat Ballpark || Facebook || 6–11 || Austin Smith (2–0) || Boston Mabeus (0–1) || None || 700 || 1–2 || –
|- bgcolor="#ccffcc"
| February 23 || at Texas State || – || Bobcat Ballpark  || ESPN+ || 7–6(10) || Mitch McIntyre (1–0) || Tristan Stivors (0–1) || None || 700 || 2–2 || –
|- align="center" bgcolor="ffbbb"
| February 24 || at #19 Texas || – || UFCU Disch-Falk Field  || LHN || 1–3 || Cole Quintanilla (1–0) || Boston Mabeus (0–2) || Tanner Witt (1) || 1,474 || 2–3 || –
|- align="center" bgcolor="ffbbb"
| February 25 || at #19 Texas || – || UFCU Disch-Falk Field || LHN || 6–12 || Palmer Wenzel (1–0) || Bryce Robison (1–1) || None || 1,424 || 2–4 || –
|- align="center" bgcolor="ffbbb"
| February 26 || at #19 Texas || – || UFCU Disch-Falk Field || LHN || 1–11 || Ty Madden (1–1) || Cy Nielson (0–1) || None || 1,504 || 2–5 || –
|- bgcolor="#ccffcc"
| February 27 || at #19 Texas || – || UFCU Disch-Falk Field || LHN || 5–4 || Reid McLaughlin (1–0) || Caden Noah (0–1) || Mitch McIntyre (1) || 1,524 || 3–5 || –
|-

|- align="center" bgcolor="ffbbb"
| March 4 || at Oregon State || – || Goss Stadium at Coleman Field  || P12+ OSU || 0–1 || Reid Sebby (2–0) || Mikade Johnson (0–1) || Jake Mulholland (2) || 0 || 3–6 || –
|- align="center" bgcolor="ffbbb"
| March 5 || at Oregon State || – || Goss Stadium at Coleman Field  || P12+ OSU || 3–5 || Joey Mundt (1–0) || Carter Smith (0–1) || Nathan Burns (1) || 0 || 3–7 || –
|- align="center" bgcolor="ffbbb"
| March 6 || at Oregon State || – || Goss Stadium at Coleman Field || P12+ OSU || 3–4 || Jake Mulholland (1–0) || Tyson Heaton (0–1) || None || 0 || 3–8 || –
|- align="center" bgcolor="ffbbb"
| March 11 || at Utah || – || Smith's Ballpark || P12+ UT || 3–6 || Matthew Sox (2–0) || Mikade Johnson (0–2) || None || 0 || 3–9 || –
|- align="center" bgcolor="ffbbb"
| March 12 || at Utah || – || Smith's Ballpark  || P12+ UT || 1–7 || Kyle Robeniol (1–1) || Cy Nielson (0–2) || None || 0 || 3–10 || –
|- bgcolor="#CCCCCC"
| March 13 || Utah || – || Larry H. Miller Field || BYUtv ||   colspan=7|  Cancelled- Snowstorm
|- align="center" bgcolor="ffbbb"
| March 16 || at Dixie State || – || Bruce Hurst Field  || WAC DN || 4–5 || Brayden Bonner (1–0) || Mikade Johnson (0–3) || None || 721 || 3–11 || – 
|- bgcolor="#ccffcc"
| March 18 || * || – || George C. Page Stadium  || WCC Net  || 5–4 || Easton Walker (1–1) || CJ Fernandezees (1–1) || Reid McLaughlin (2) || 0 || 4–11 || 1–0
|- bgcolor="#ccffcc"
| March 19 || * || – || George C. Page Stadium  ||  || 9–2 || Boston Mabeus (1–2) || Jimmy Galicia (1–4) || None || 0 || 5–11 || 2–0
|- bgcolor="#ccffcc"
| March 20 || * || – || George C. Page Stadium  ||  || 4–1 || Cy Nielson (1–2) || Holden Chtistian (0–1) || Bryce Robison (1) || 0 || 6–11 || 3–0  
|- bgcolor="#ccffcc"
| March 23 || Utah Valley || – || Larry H. Miller Field  || BYUtv.org || 11–7 || Boston Mabeus (2–2) || Jaxson Otis (0–2) || Bryce Robison (2) || 495 || 7–11 || –  
|- bgcolor="#ccffcc"
| March 25 || San Francisco* || – || Larry H. Miller Field  || BYUtv.org || 8–7(10) || Bryce Robison (2–1) || Max Jones (0–1) || None || 492 || 8–11 || 4–0 
|- align="center" bgcolor="ffbbb"
| March 26 || San Francisco* || – || Larry H. Miller Field  || BYUtv.org || 6–10(10) || Jesse Barron (1–2) || Mitch McIntyre (1–1) || None || 798 || 8–12 || 4–1  
|- align="center" bgcolor="ffbbb"
| March 27 || San Francisco* || – || Larry H. Miller Field  || BYUtv.org || 1–3 || Eric Reyzelman (1–1) || Jack Sterner (0–1) || Jesse Barron (3) || 799 || 8–13 || 4–2  
|-

|- align="center" bgcolor="ffbbb"
| April 1 || at Santa Clara* || – || Stephen Schott Stadium  || WCC Net || 0–5 || Nick Sando (1–1) || Easton Walker (1–2) || Alex Reelfs (1) || 0 || 8–14 || 4–3
|- align="center" bgcolor="ffbbb"
| April 2 || at Santa Clara* || – || Stephen Schott Stadium  || WCC Net || 3–11 || Brandon Buckley (2–1) || Carter Smith (0–2) || Jared Feikes (1) || 0 || 8–15 || 4–4 
|- bgcolor="#ccffcc"
| April 3 || at Santa Clara* || – || Stephen Schott Stadium  || WCC Net || 3–1 || Bryce Robison (3–1) || Cole Kitchen (5–1) || None || 0 || 9–15 || 5–4
|- align="center" bgcolor="ffbbb"
| April 8 || Portland* || – || Larry H. Miller Field || BYUtv.org || 3–5 || Caleb Franzen (1–2) || Bryce Robison (3–2) || Eli Morse (8) || 492 || 9–16 || 5–5
|- bgcolor="#ccffcc"
| April 9 || Portland* || – || Larry H. Miller Field || BYUtv || 1–0 || Reid McLaughlin (2–1) || Eli Morse (0–1) || None || 487 || 10–16 || 6–5 
|- align="center" bgcolor="ffbbb"
| April 10 || Portland* || – || Larry H. Miller Field || BYUtv || 6–7 || Eli Morse (1–1) || Carter Smith (0–3) || None || 496 || 10–17 || 6–6
|- bgcolor="#ccffcc"
| April 13 || Utah || – || Larry H. Miller Field || BYUtv.org || 7–4 || Bryce Robison (4–2) || Dustyn Schramm (0–2) || Reid McLaughlin (3) || 742 || 11–17 || – 
|- align="center" bgcolor="ffbbb"
| April 15 || at Omaha || – || Tal Anderson Field || Mavs All-Access || 1–2 || Joey Machado (3–3) || Easton Walker (1–3) || Tanner Howe (1) || 361 || 11–18 || –
|- align="center" bgcolor="ffbbb"
| April 16 || at Omaha || – || Tal Anderson Field || NET || 5–6 || Josiah Scott (3–1) || Reid McLaughlin (2–1) || None || 322 || 11–19 || –
|- align="center" bgcolor="ffbbb"
| April 17 || at Omaha || – || Tal Anderson Field  || Mavs All-Access || 1–4 || Mark Timmins (3–2) || Carter Smith (0–4) || None || 533 || 11–20 || – 
|- bgcolor="#ccffcc"
| April 20 || Dixie State || – || Larry H. Miller Field  || BYUtv.org || 3–2 || Cy Nielson (2–2) || Haiden Hendricks (0–1) || Reid McLaughlin (4) || 493 || 12–20 || –
|- align="center" bgcolor="ffbbb"
| April 22 || at Gonzaga* || – || Patterson Baseball Complex || WCC Net || 1–12 || Alek Jacob (4–1) || Easton Walker (1–4) || None || 250 || 12–21 || 6–7
|- align="center" bgcolor="ffbbb"
| April 23 || at Gonzaga* || – || Patterson Baseball Complex || WCC Net || 1–2 || Gabriel Hughes (3–2) || Jack Sterner (0–2) || Brody Jessee (3) || 400 || 12–22 || 6–8 
|- align="center" bgcolor="ffbbb"
| April 24 || at Gonzaga* || – || Patterson Baseball Complex || SWX || 3–7 || Michael Spellacy (3–2) || Boston Mabeus (3–3) || Trystan Vrieling (1) || 150 || 12–23 || 6–9 
|- bgcolor="#ccffcc"
| April 27 || #26 Arizona State || – || Larry H. Miller Field  || BYUtv.org || 8–5 || Bryce Robison (5–2) || Jared Glenn (4–1) || Reid McLaughlin (5) || 422 || 13–23 || – 
|- bgcolor="#ccffcc"
| April 29 || Saint Mary's* || – || Larry H. Miller Field  || BYUtv.org || 12–0 || Easton Walker (2–4) || Ryan Taurek (2–2) || None || 497 || 14–23 || 7–9 
|- bgcolor="#ccffcc"
| April 30 || Saint Mary's* || – || Larry H. Miller Field  || BYUtv || 4–2 || Cooper McKeehan (1–0) || Sam Bower (4–4) || Reid McLaughlin (6) || 492 || 15–23 || 8–9 
|-

|- bgcolor="#ccffcc"
| May 1 || Saint Mary's* || – || Larry H. Miller Field  || BYUtv || 4–3 || Bryce Robison (6–2) || Ky Bush (5–4) || Cooper McKeehan (1–0) || 496 || 16–23 || 9–9
|- bgcolor="#ccffcc"
| May 4 || at Utah Valley || – || UCCU Ballpark  || WAC DN || 11–4 || Cy Nielson (3–2) || Devin Smith (0–3) || None || 2,053 || 17–23 || –
|- bgcolor="#ccffcc"
| May 6 || at San Diego* || – || Fowler Park || WCC Net || 6–4 (10) || Reid McLaughlin (3–1) || Ryan Robinson (2–1) || None || 100 || 18–23 || 10–9 
|- bgcolor="#ccffcc"
| May 7 || at San Diego* || – || Fowler Park || WCC Net || 11–10 || Cooper McKeehan (2–0) || Conner Thurman (5–3) || Carter Smith (1) || 100 || 19–23 || 11–9
|- align="center" bgcolor="ffbbb"
| May 8 || at San Diego* || – || Fowler Park || WCC Net || 12–13 || Brycen Mautz (3–1) || Easton Walker (2–5) || None || 100 || 19–24 || 11–10
|- align="center" bgcolor="ffbbb"
| May 13 || at Pacific* || – || Klein Family Field  || WCC Net || 3–6 || Joe Solomon (1–1) || Cooper McKeehan (2–1) || Zach Patterson (3) || 60 || 19–25 || 11–11
|- bgcolor="#ccffcc"
| May 14 || at Pacific* || – || Klein Family Field  || WCC Net || 5–0 || Jack Sterner (1–2) || Hayden Pearce (3–7) || Carter Smith (2) || 80 || 20–25 || 12–11
|- bgcolor="#ccffcc"
|May 15 || at Pacific* || – || Klein Family Field || WCC Net || 6–0 || Bryce Robison (7–2) || Hunter Schilperoort (1–2) || None || 100 || 21–25 || 13–11
|- align="center" bgcolor="ffbbb"
|May 18 || Utah || – || Larry H. Miller Field || BYUtv.org || 5–11 || Randon Hostert (3–0) || Cy Nielson (3–3) || None || 494 || 21–26 || –
|- align="center" bgcolor="ffbbb"
|May 20 || Pepperdine* || – || Larry H. Miller Field || BYUtv.org || 3–6 || Brandon Llewellyn (4–1) || Easton Walker (2–6) || Trevor Hinkel (1) || 492 || 21–27 || 13–12
|- bgcolor="#ccffcc"
|May 21 || Pepperdine* || – || Larry H. Miller Field || BYUtv.org || 14–5 || Carter Smith (1–4) || Shane Telfer (2–1) || None || 490 || 22–27 || 14–12
|- bgcolor="#ccffcc"
|May 22 || Pepperdine* || – || Larry H. Miller Field || BYUtv.org || 14–7 || Drew Zimmerman (1–0)' || Nathan Diamond (2–4) || None || 500 || 23–27 || 15–12
|-

| style="font-size:88%" | Rankings from Collegiate Baseball. Parenthesis indicate tournament seedings.*West Coast Conference games

Rivalries
BYU had two main rivalries on their schedule- the Deseret First Duel vs. Utah and the UCCU Crosstown Clash vs. Utah Valley. New D1 state team Dixie State also played the Cougars.

Radio Information
BYU Baseball was once again broadcast as part of the NuSkin BYU Sports Network. BYU Radio 107.9 KUMT served as the flagship station. However, because of a women's soccer and general conference conflicts, some radio broadcasts were App exclusives, and the first three games against Texas State didn't have a radio broadcast. Jason Shepherd and Greg Wrubell rotated providing play-by-play after Brent Norton retired from the position after 30 seasons. Tuckett Slade served as analyst on most broadcasts.

TV Announcers
Texas State: Brant Freeman & Ty HarringtonTexas State: Brant Freeman & Ty HarringtonTexas State: Tuckett Slade
Texas State: Brant Freeman & Ty HarringtonTexas: Keith Moreland & Greg SwindellTexas: Keith Moreland & Greg SwindellTexas: Keith Moreland & Greg SwindellTexas: Keith Moreland & Greg SwindellOregon State: Mike ParkerOregon State: Mike ParkerOregon State: Mike ParkerUtah: Brian Preece & Mike Lageschulte
Utah: Brian Preece & Scott Stephens
Dixie State: No commentaryLoyola Marymount: Nick Koop & Aidan Buzo
Utah Valley: Spencer Linton, Gary Sheide, & Jason Shepherd
San Francisco: Spencer Linton, Gary Sheide, & Jason ShepherdSan Francisco: Spencer Linton & Jason ShepherdSan Francisco: Dave McCann & Gary SheideSanta Clara: Joe Ritzo
Santa Clara: Daniel Barrera
Santa Clara: Anthony Passarelli
Portland: Spencer Linton & Gary SheidePortland: Spencer Linton & Gary SheidePortland: Dave McCann & Gary SheideUtah: Spencer Linton, Gary Sheide, & Jason ShepherdOmaha: Jack McGonigal & Joey Colbert
Omaha: Larry Punteney & Jeff Leise
Omaha: Ana Bellinghausen, Avarie Howard, & Alexa Blase
Dixie State: Spencer Linton, Gary Sheide, & Jason ShepherdGonzaga: Greg Talbott
Gonzaga: Greg TalbottGonzaga: Dave Cotton & Billy MoonArizona State: Jason Shepherd & Gary SheideSaint Mary's: Spencer Linton & Gary SheideSaint Mary's: Spencer Linton & Gary SheideSaint Mary's: Dave McCann & Gary SheideUtah Valley: Jordan Bianucci & Ryan Pickens
San Diego: Jack MurraySan Diego: Jack MurraySan Diego: Jack MurrayPacific: Jeff Dominick
Pacific: Dennis Ackerman
Pacific: Dennis AckermanUtah: Dave McCann, Gary Sheide, & Jason ShepherdPepperdine: Spencer Linton, Gary Sheide, & Jason ShepherdPepperdine: Spencer Linton, Gary Sheide, & Jason ShepherdPepperdine: Dave McCann, Gary Sheide, & Jason Shepherd''

References 

2021 West Coast Conference baseball season
2021 team
2021 in sports in Utah